Quddus (Quddūs ) is one of the names of God in Islam, meaning "The Most Holy". It may also serve as a name, typically in construct form with "abd". See:

Abdul Quddus, Male theophoric given name
Quddus (TV personality) (born 1980), Canadian television personality

People
Quddús (1820–1849), title of the most prominent disciple of the Báb
Quddus Fielea (born 1967), Tongan rugby union footballer
Quddus Khojamyarov (1918–1994), Uyghur Kazakhstani composer and musical performer
Isa Abdul-Quddus (born 1988), American football safety for the Detroit Lions of the National Football League (NFL)
Quddus Mirza (born 1961), Pakistani artist and critic
Quddus Muhammadiy (1907–1997), Ubekistani writer
Shahrukh Quddus (born 1996), Kuwaiti cricketer
Abdul Quddus  (born 1946), Pakistani Businessman 

Arabic masculine given names
Names of God in Islam